Methylbutanol may refer to:

 tert-Amyl alcohol (2-methylbutan-2-ol), a branched pentanol
 Isoamyl alcohol (3-methylbutan-1-ol), a colorless liquid
 2-Methyl-1-butanol, an organic chemical compound
 3-Methyl-2-butanol, an organic chemical compound  used as a solvent and an intermediate